The Chapel at the College of St Mark and St John is a Grade II listed building at 459a Fulham Road, Chelsea, London SW10 9UZ.

History
It was built in 1841 by the architect Edward Blore who presented his designs, in various drafts, for approval by  Derwent Coleridge, the first principal,
as the chapel of St. Mark's College, Chelsea, established by the charity renamed the National Society for Promoting Religious Education.  The college soon specialised in teaching of education, arts and other areas and later moved to Devon to become the University of St Mark & St John also known as Plymouth Marjon University.

Conversion into two houses
As of 2017, the chapel is being redeveloped to create two houses, and has been renamed 1 and 2 The King's Chapel.

References

Buildings and structures in the Royal Borough of Kensington and Chelsea
Grade II listed churches in London
Churches completed in 1841
University and college chapels in the United Kingdom